Alan Casagrande de Moura (born 16 February 1987, in Rio de Janeiro) is a Brazilian footballer who plays as a midfielder.

After he turned 19, he was sold to AC Bellinzona in January 2007. On 14 January 2008, he signed a contract with Bragantino until the end of the 2008 Campeonato Paulista season. In the 2008–09 season he left for GC Biaschesi in the Swiss 1. Liga.

External links
 CBF

1987 births
Living people
Brazilian expatriate footballers
Ternana Calcio players
AC Bellinzona players
Clube Atlético Bragantino players
Expatriate footballers in Italy
Association football midfielders
Brazilian people of Italian descent
Footballers from Rio de Janeiro (city)
Brazilian footballers